Roderick John Mackay  (20 July 1874 - 24 November 1956)  was Dean of Edinburgh from 1939 to 1954.

He was educated at  Hatfield College, Durham. He was awarded a Theological Scholarship in 1899, the Barry Scholarship in 1901, and won the Theological Prize the same year. He was also elected President of the Durham Union, serving for Michaelmas term of 1901. He served curacies in Pallion, Greenock and Edinburgh. He was Priest in Charge of  St Matthew, Edinburgh from 1904 to 1909; Rector of St Martin, Edinburgh from 1909 to 1921 and of St Peter, Edinburgh from 1921 to 1954 (also Synod Clerk for the Diocese of Edinburgh from 1934 to 1939).

Notes

1874 births
1956 deaths
Alumni of Hatfield College, Durham
Scottish Episcopalian clergy
Deans of Edinburgh
Presidents of the Durham Union